The 2015 Atlantic Coast Conference women's basketball tournament was the postseason women's basketball tournament for the Atlantic Coast Conference held March 4–8, 2015, in Greensboro, North Carolina, at the Greensboro Coliseum.

Seeding
Tournament seeds are determined by teams' regular season conference record with tiebreakers determined by ACC tiebreaking rules.

Schedule

Bracket

Awards and honors
Tournament MVP: Jewell Loyd – Notre Dame

All-Tournament teams:

First Team
Jewell Loyd – Notre Dame
Brianna Turner – Notre Dame
Elizabeth Williams – Duke
Dearica Hamby – Wake Forest
Shakayla Thomas – Florida State

Second Team
Madison Cable – Notre Dame
Taya Reimer – Notre Dame
Stephanie Mavunga – North Carolina
Vanessa Panousis – Virginia Tech
Leticia Romero – Florida State

See also
 2015 ACC men's basketball tournament

References

2014–15 Atlantic Coast Conference women's basketball season
ACC women's basketball tournament
Basketball competitions in Greensboro, North Carolina
College sports in North Carolina
Women's sports in North Carolina
2015 in sports in North Carolina